The 1999 Marshall Thundering Herd football team represented Marshall University in the 1999 NCAA Division I-A football season. The Thundering Herd played their home games at Marshall University Stadium in Huntington, West Virginia, and competed in the East Division of the Mid-American Conference (MAC). The team was coached by fourth-year head coach Bob Pruett. Marshall became the second non-automatic qualifying team in the Bowl Championship Series (BCS) era to finish the year ranked in the top 10 of the AP Poll.

Marshall outscored its opponents 463–137 en route to an undefeated, 13–0, season. The season-opener at Clemson (13–10) and the MAC Championship Game vs. Western Michigan (34–30) were the only games decided by less than 12 points.

Schedule

Game summaries

Clemson

Liberty

Bowling Green

Temple

Miami (OH)

Toledo

Buffalo

Northern Illinois

Kent State

Western Michigan

Ohio

Western Michigan–MAC Championship

BYU–Motor City Bowl

Roster

Team players drafted in the NFL
The following players were selected in the 2000 NFL Draft.

Awards and honors
Chad Pennington, Davey O'Brien Trophy finalist
Chad Pennington, Heisman Trophy Finalist
Chad Pennington, MAC Championship Game MVP and MAC Offensive Player of the Year
Chad Pennington, 1st Team All-MAC
Nate Poole, 1st Team All-MAC
Giradie Mercer, 1st Team All-MAC
Doug Chapman, 1st Team All-MAC
John Grace, 1st Team All-MAC
Rogers Beckett, 1st Team All-MAC
James Williams, 1st Team All-MAC

Rankings

References

Marshall
Marshall Thundering Herd football seasons
Mid-American Conference football champion seasons
Little Caesars Pizza Bowl champion seasons
College football undefeated seasons
Marshall Thundering Herd football